Craig Steven Powell (born November 13, 1971) is a former American football player who played linebacker in the National Football League from 1995 through 1998. He played college football at Ohio State University.

NFL career
Powell was the Cleveland Browns' final first-round pick before the team moved to Baltimore. After leaving the NFL in 1998, Powell later moved to the XFL in 2001, playing one season for the San Francisco Demons.

References

1971 births
Living people
American football linebackers
Ohio State Buckeyes football players
Cleveland Browns players
Baltimore Ravens players
New York Jets players
San Francisco Demons players
Players of American football from Youngstown, Ohio